Saúl Gutiérrez Macedo (born 28 December 1992) is a Mexican taekwondo practitioner.

Gutiérrez first garnered attention in September 2014 when he won the gold medal in the bantamweight division (under 63 kg) at the Pan American Championships held in Aguascalientes, Mexico. In November 2014, Gutiérrez won another bantamweight gold at the Central American and Caribbean Games held in Veracruz, Mexico.

Gutiérrez competed in his first World Championship in 2015, where he won bronze by losing to two-time world champion Joel González of Spain 6:5 in the semifinals.

He competed at the 2016 Summer Olympics and failed to make it past the first round by losing to a competitor from Mongolia.

References

External links

1992 births
Living people
Mexican male taekwondo practitioners
Sportspeople from Michoacán
People from Lázaro Cárdenas, Michoacán
Pan American Games gold medalists for Mexico
Taekwondo practitioners at the 2015 Pan American Games
Olympic taekwondo practitioners of Mexico
Taekwondo practitioners at the 2016 Summer Olympics
Pan American Games medalists in taekwondo
Central American and Caribbean Games gold medalists for Mexico
Competitors at the 2014 Central American and Caribbean Games
World Taekwondo Championships medalists
Central American and Caribbean Games medalists in taekwondo
Medalists at the 2015 Pan American Games
21st-century Mexican people